Richard Hobson may refer to:
 Richard Hobson (priest), Irish Anglican priest
 Richard R. G. Hobson, member of the Virginia House of Delegates